Bretzia is an extinct genus of deer that was endemic to North America. Two species have been described.

Taxonomy and evolution 
The genus Bretzia was named in 1974 by paleontologist Eric Paul Gustafson and his colleague Willis Fry. It was named after geologist J. Harlan Bretz. Bretzia pseudalces is notable for being one of the first deer to live in North America, and one of the earliest ancestors to all New World Deer. Fossils of sister species Bretzia nebrascensis has been found in Nebraska and South Dakota. This species survived until the very end of the Pleistocene or Early Holocene (around 10,000 BP).

References

Capreolinae
Prehistoric deer
Prehistoric mammals of North America
Pliocene mammals of North America
Pleistocene mammals of North America
Prehistoric mammal genera